Grimston may refer to:

Places
Grimston, East Riding of Yorkshire, England
Grimston, Leicestershire, England
Grimston, Norfolk, England
Grimston, Nottinghamshire, England
Grimston, Selby, England, the location of Grimston Park, North Yorkshire, England
Grimston Park, Selby, England, country house
Grimston, York, a location in the United Kingdom
Grimstone, North Yorkshire, a separate village near York, England, sometimes referred to as "Grimston"

People
Baron Grimston of Westbury, a title in the Peerage of the United Kingdom
Doug Grimston (1900–1955), Canadian ice hockey administrator
Edward Grimston (disambiguation)
James Grimston (disambiguation)
Grimston baronets
Robert Grimston (disambiguation)
Viscount Grimston, a title in the Peerage of the United Kingdom

Other uses
Grimston Hall, 17th–18th century home of the Barker baronets, Suffolk, England
Grimston Manor, a manor house in Norfolk, England
Grimston railway station, Saxelbye village, Leicestershire, English

See also 
Grimstone (disambiguation)